Milton J. Fahrney, sometimes credited as Milton H. Fahrney or simply Milton Fahrney, was an actor and director during the silent film era.

He worked for Albuquerque Film Manufacturing Company and Nestor Film Company.

He featured comedian George Ovey in films.

He married Alexandra Phillips, a screenwriter.

He directed the Cub Comedies. He engaged Louise Horner to play a role in the Jerry series. Fahrney wrote and directed dozens of shorts for the series.

Filmography

Director
The Pilgrim (1910)
The Law of the Range (1911 film)
His Only Son (1912)
White Cloud's Secret(1912), extant at EYE collection in Netherlands
The Little Hero (1915)
The Little Detective (1915), a Cub Comedies
Jerry's Big Game (1916)
Jerry and the Smugglers (1916)
Jerry in the Movies (1916)
Holding His Own (1917), extant
The Hero of the E.Z. Ranch 
Jerry and the Bandits
Jerry and the Vampire

Actor
Yankee Speed (1924)
The Right Man (1925)
In the First Degree (1927)
Stepping on the Gas (1927)

References

External links
 

20th-century American male actors
American male silent film actors
American film directors
American screenwriters